St. Elmo is a city in Fayette County, Illinois, United States. The population was 1,254 at the 2020 census.  St. Elmo was established in 1871.

Geography
St. Elmo is located at  (39.026709, -88.852062).

History

Demographics

As of the census of 2010, there were 1,426 people, 564 households, and 394 families residing in the city. The racial makeup of the city was 98% White, 0.07% African American, 0.07% Asian, 0.14% Pacific Islander, 0.34% from other races, and 0.48% from two or more races. Hispanic or Latino of any race were 0.09% of the population.

There were 564 households, out of which 35.1% had children under the age of 18 living with them, 54.1% were married couples living together, 11.9% had a female householder with no husband present, and 30.0% were non-families. 28.0% of all households were made up of individuals, and 16.3% had someone living alone who was 65 years of age or older.  The average household size was 2.49 and the average family size was 3.01.

In the city, the population was spread out, with 27% under the age of 18, 6.8% from 18 to 24, 26.4% from 25 to 44, 19.2% from 45 to 64, and 19.4% who were 65 years of age or older.  The median age was 38 years. For every 100 females, there were 87.6 males.  For every 100 females age 18 and over, there were 87.4 males.

The median income for a household in the city was $30,750, and the median income for a family was $36,544. Males had a median income of $29,250 versus $21,250 for females. The per capita income for the city was $14,048.  About 12.1% of families and 12.7% of the population were below the poverty line, including 14.8% of those under age 18 and 15.4% of those age 65 or over.

Education

St. Elmo is home to St. Elmo Community School District #202, which consists of the St. Elmo Elementary School, located at 519 West 2nd Street and the St. Elmo Jr/Sr High School located at the far northern edge of town at 300 West 12th Street.

References

External links
Official City Website

Cities in Fayette County, Illinois
Cities in Illinois
Populated places established in 1871
1871 establishments in Illinois